The 2011 West Somerset District Council election took place on 5 May 2011 to elect members of West Somerset District Council in Somerset, England. The whole council was up for election with boundary changes since the last election in 2007 reducing the number of seats by 3. The Conservative Party gained overall control of the council from Independents.

Background
Before the election Conservative Tim Taylor was the leader of the council in an alliance with Independents. Since the 2007 election boundary changes reduced the number of seats on the council from 31 to 28.

A total of 63 candidates stood at the election for the 28 seats on the council. These included 15 sitting councillors and a record 12 Green Party candidates, a party that had not contested any seats in West Somerset in 2007. This was compared to only 4 Labour Party and 2 Liberal Democrat candidates, with the number of Green candidates being put down to the proposal for a new nuclear power plant at Hinkley Point. One seat, Greater Exmoor, only had one candidate, Conservative Steven Pugsley, so he was elected without opposition.

Election result
The Conservatives took control of the council with 19 councillors after gaining 6 seats. This was mainly at the expense of Independents who dropped 9 seats, with only 7 independents being elected. The independent losses included the defeat of councillors Sandra Slade and Paul Tipney in Minehead South and Quantock Vale respectively.

The Labour Party gained a seat to move to 2 councillors, while the Liberal Democrats lost their only seat on the council and the Greens failed to win any seats.

Ward results

References

2011 English local elections
2011
2010s in Somerset